Chris Head may refer to:

 Chris Head (musician), guitarist with Anti-Flag
 Chris Head (politician) (born 1963), American politician